Nebojša Ilić is the name of:
 Nebojša Ilić (basketball) (born 1968), Serbian basketball executive and former player
 Nebojša Ilić (actor) (born 1973), Serbian actor